Naderi Café is one of the old cafés in Tehran. It is located to the east of Hafez overpass along Jomhouri-e Eslami Avenue.

References

Restaurants in Tehran